Skip Macdonald is an American film and television editor known for his work on Breaking Bad (2008–2013), its spin-off series Better Call Saul (2015–2022), and the 2019 sequel film El Camino. He also edited several episodes for Fargo. Macdonald has earned a total of ten Emmy Award nominations. In 2014, he won an Emmy for Outstanding Single-Camera Picture Editing for the series finale of Breaking Bad.

Career
Skip Macdonald began his career as an assistant sound editor in the 1980s. During this time, he worked on Heaven's Gate (1980), Things Are Tough All Over, and the Carl Reiner-directed Dead Men Don't Wear Plaid (1982) and The Man with Two Brains (1983). After completing Cheech & Chong's The Corsican Brothers in 1984, Macdonald made his second collaboration with filmmaker Michael Cimino, after Heaven's Gate, with Year of the Dragon in 1985.

Macdonald's first project serving as an assistant film editor was in 1988's television film Little Girl Lost. In the following years, he assisted with the editing of Harley Davidson and the Marlboro Man (1991), the Perry Mason film The Case of the Killer Kiss (1993), White Fang 2: Myth of the White Wolf and Nell (1994), Kansas and In Pursuit of Honor (1995), and Primal Fear (1996). In 1997, Macdonald had his "" after becoming an editor for Buffy the Vampire Slayer.

In 2008, Macdonald began editing the Vince Gilligan-created series Breaking Bad, a show that received universal acclaim and earned Macdonald (following three other nominations) the Primetime Emmy Award for Outstanding Single-Camera Picture Editing for a Drama Series in 2014 for his work on the series finale. That same year, he worked on the drama series Fargo and earned three nominations for the Primetime Emmy Award for Outstanding Single-Camera Picture Editing for a Limited Series or Movie. Macdonald made his second collaboration with Gilligan on the Breaking Bad spin-off series Better Call Saul, which earned him two more Emmy Award nominations. In 2019, he made his third collaboration with Gilligan on the Netflix film El Camino, a sequel to Breaking Bad centered on the character of Jesse Pinkman. The film, which also received universal acclaim from critics, earned Macdonald his tenth and most recent Primetime Emmy Award nomination.

Filmography

Film

Television

Accolades

References

Notes

Citations

External links
 

American Cinema Editors
American film editors
Living people
Year of birth missing (living people)